Pishin may refer to:

Iran
 Pishin, Iran, city in Sistan and Baluchestan Province, Iran
 Pishin District (Iran), district in Sistan and Baluchestan Province, Iran

 Pakistan
 Pishin, Pakistan, city in Balochistan, Pakistan
 Pishin District, district in Balochistan, Pakistan
 Pishin Valley, valley in Pishin District, Balochistan, Pakistan